Tin oxide may refer to:

 Tin(II) oxide (stannous oxide), a black powder with the formula SnO
 Tin(IV) oxide (tin dioxide, stannic oxide), a white powder with the formula SnO2